Klimovo is the name of several inhabited localities in Russia.

Bryansk Oblast
As of 2010, one urban locality in Bryansk Oblast bears this name:
Klimovo, Bryansk Oblast, a work settlement in Klimovsky District

Chuvash Republic
As of 2010, one rural locality in the Chuvash Republic bears this name:
Klimovo, Chuvash Republic, a selo in Klimovskoye Rural Settlement of Ibresinsky District

Ivanovo Oblast
As of 2010, two rural localities in Ivanovo Oblast bear this name:
Klimovo, Furmanovsky District, Ivanovo Oblast, a village in Furmanovsky District
Klimovo, Privolzhsky District, Ivanovo Oblast, a village in Privolzhsky District

Kostroma Oblast
As of 2010, two rural localities in Kostroma Oblast bear this name:
Klimovo, Ostrovsky District, Kostroma Oblast, a village in Klevantsovskoye Settlement of Ostrovsky District
Klimovo, Vokhomsky District, Kostroma Oblast, a village in Belkovskoye Settlement of Vokhomsky District

Leningrad Oblast
As of 2010, three rural localities in Leningrad Oblast bear this name:
Klimovo, Anisimovskoye Settlement Municipal Formation, Boksitogorsky District, Leningrad Oblast, a village in Anisimovskoye Settlement Municipal Formation of Boksitogorsky District
Klimovo, Klimovskoye Settlement Municipal Formation, Boksitogorsky District, Leningrad Oblast, a village in Klimovskoye Settlement Municipal Formation of Boksitogorsky District
Klimovo, Vyborgsky District, Leningrad Oblast, a logging depot settlement in Krasnoselskoye Settlement Municipal Formation of Vyborgsky District

Lipetsk Oblast
As of 2010, one rural locality in Lipetsk Oblast bears this name:
Klimovo, Lipetsk Oblast, a selo in Lomovskoy Selsoviet of Chaplyginsky District

Moscow Oblast
As of 2010, four rural localities in Moscow Oblast bear this name:
Klimovo, Ozyorsky District, Moscow Oblast, a village in Klishinskoye Rural Settlement of Ozyorsky District
Klimovo, Sergiyevo-Posadsky District, Moscow Oblast, a village in Selkovskoye Rural Settlement of Sergiyevo-Posadsky District
Klimovo, Solnechnogorsky District, Moscow Oblast, a village in Krivtsovskoye Rural Settlement of Solnechnogorsky District
Klimovo, Taldomsky District, Moscow Oblast, a village in Kvashenkovskoye Rural Settlement of Taldomsky District

Novgorod Oblast
As of 2010, two rural localities in Novgorod Oblast bear this name:
Klimovo, Demyansky District, Novgorod Oblast, a village in Polnovskoye Settlement of Demyansky District
Klimovo, Pestovsky District, Novgorod Oblast, a village in Pestovskoye Settlement of Pestovsky District

Oryol Oblast
As of 2010, one rural locality in Oryol Oblast bears this name:
Klimovo, Oryol Oblast, a selo in Gerasimovsky Selsoviet of Shablykinsky District

Pskov Oblast
As of 2010, seven rural localities in Pskov Oblast bear this name:
Klimovo (Bezhanitskaya Rural Settlement), Bezhanitsky District, Pskov Oblast, a village in Bezhanitsky District; municipally, a part of Bezhanitskaya Rural Settlement of that district
Klimovo (Chikhachevskaya Rural Settlement), Bezhanitsky District, Pskov Oblast, a village in Bezhanitsky District; municipally, a part of Chikhachevskaya Rural Settlement of that district
Klimovo, Novorzhevsky District, Pskov Oblast, a village in Novorzhevsky District
Klimovo, Novosokolnichesky District, Pskov Oblast, a village in Novosokolnichesky District
Klimovo, Porkhovsky District, Pskov Oblast, a village in Porkhovsky District
Klimovo (Nosovskaya Rural Settlement), Pytalovsky District, Pskov Oblast, a village in Pytalovsky District; municipally, a part of Nosovskaya Rural Settlement of that district
Klimovo (Vyshgorodskaya Rural Settlement), Pytalovsky District, Pskov Oblast, a village in Pytalovsky District; municipally, a part of Vyshgorodskaya Rural Settlement of that district

Smolensk Oblast
As of 2010, two rural localities in Smolensk Oblast bear this name:
Klimovo, Velizhsky District, Smolensk Oblast, a village in Seleznevskoye Rural Settlement of Velizhsky District
Klimovo, Yartsevsky District, Smolensk Oblast, a village in Repinskoye Rural Settlement of Yartsevsky District

Tver Oblast
As of 2010, nine rural localities in Tver Oblast bear this name:
Klimovo, Likhoslavlsky District, Tver Oblast, a village in Likhoslavlsky District
Klimovo (Sholokhovo Rural Settlement), Rzhevsky District, Tver Oblast, a village in Rzhevsky District; municipally, a part of Sholokhovo Rural Settlement of that district
Klimovo (Itomlya Rural Settlement), Rzhevsky District, Tver Oblast, a village in Rzhevsky District; municipally, a part of Itomlya Rural Settlement of that district
Klimovo, Spirovsky District, Tver Oblast, a village in Spirovsky District
Klimovo (Staritskoye Rural Settlement), Staritsky District, Tver Oblast, a village in Staritsky District; municipally, a part of Staritskoye Rural Settlement of that district
Klimovo (Stepurinskoye Rural Settlement), Staritsky District, Tver Oblast, a village in Staritsky District; municipally, a part of Stepurinskoye Rural Settlement of that district
Klimovo (Bernovskoye Rural Settlement), Staritsky District, Tver Oblast, a village in Staritsky District; municipally, a part of Bernovskoye Rural Settlement of that district
Klimovo (Arkhangelskoye Rural Settlement), Staritsky District, Tver Oblast, a village in Staritsky District; municipally, a part of Arkhangelskoye Rural Settlement of that district
Klimovo, Torzhoksky District, Tver Oblast, a village in Torzhoksky District

Vladimir Oblast
As of 2010, three rural localities in Vladimir Oblast bear this name:
Klimovo, Kirzhachsky District, Vladimir Oblast, a village in Kirzhachsky District
Klimovo, Kovrovsky District, Vladimir Oblast, a village in Kovrovsky District
Klimovo, Muromsky District, Vladimir Oblast, a settlement in Muromsky District

Vologda Oblast
As of 2010, six rural localities in Vologda Oblast bear this name:
Klimovo, Cherepovetsky District, Vologda Oblast, a village in Malechkinsky Selsoviet of Cherepovetsky District
Klimovo, Frolovsky Selsoviet, Gryazovetsky District, Vologda Oblast, a village in Frolovsky Selsoviet of Gryazovetsky District
Klimovo, Pertsevsky Selsoviet, Gryazovetsky District, Vologda Oblast, a village in Pertsevsky Selsoviet of Gryazovetsky District
Klimovo, Kichmengsko-Gorodetsky District, Vologda Oblast, a village in Sarayevsky Selsoviet of Kichmengsko-Gorodetsky District
Klimovo, Tarnogsky District, Vologda Oblast, a village in Shevdenitsky Selsoviet of Tarnogsky District
Klimovo, Velikoustyugsky District, Vologda Oblast, a village in Samotovinsky Selsoviet of Velikoustyugsky District

Yaroslavl Oblast
As of 2010, four rural localities in Yaroslavl Oblast bear this name:
Klimovo, Bolsheselsky District, Yaroslavl Oblast, a village in Blagoveshchensky Rural Okrug of Bolsheselsky District
Klimovo, Myshkinsky District, Yaroslavl Oblast, a village in Bogorodsky Rural Okrug of Myshkinsky District
Klimovo, Pereslavsky District, Yaroslavl Oblast, a village in Glebovsky Rural Okrug of Pereslavsky District
Klimovo, Pervomaysky District, Yaroslavl Oblast, a village in Kolkinsky Rural Okrug of Pervomaysky District